Rhysodromus histrio is a species of spiders in the family Philodromidae. It is the type species of its genus. It is found in North America, Europe, Turkey, Caucasus, Russia (Sibiria), Central Asia and China.

References

External links 
 Rhysodromus histrio at the World Spider Catalog

Philodromidae
Spiders of Europe
Spiders of Asia
Spiders of North America
Spiders described in 1819